Lilit Bleyan (born 2 June 1978) is an Armenian songwriter, singer. She writes and performs songs in Armenian, Spanish and English. The first album “In another City” was presented in November 2011. A second album with songs mostly in Spanish was released in November 2013.

Biography 

Born in Yerevan in 1978. First songs were written when she hardly started to talk. Graduated from the class of violin of a musical school. 
At the age of 14 started singing in the chamber choir “Alan Hovhannes” in Yerevan. At the school age, attracted by some Spanish songs, started learning Spanish by herself. The passion for languages led her to the Yerevan State University and she graduated as a specialist of Spanish and English. During her university studies, in a duet with a friend she attended some musical events and shows. Still, the music and songwriting kept being just a hobby.

In parallel with the university Lilit graduated from TV journalism special courses and soon became one of the young faces of the independent TV A1plus in Yerevan. She started as a journalist becoming TV observer, editor of the news section and also making some individual projects on the TV.

In 2010 she released a single in Armenian called “Waiting Trains”. The song had immediate success and made her think of recording a full album. So in 2011 her first album consisting of 9 acoustic songs in Armenian and Spanish was released. Soon she decided to refuse from her career of a journalist and focus on songwriting and singing.

The release of her second album consisting of mainly Spanish and also some English songs is planned on 19 November 2013.

Discography

In Another City (2011) 
Քաղաքից քաղաք – From Town to Town
Տրամադրություն - Mood
Սպասող գնացքներ – Waiting Trains
Երազելով ծովի մասին – Dreaming of the Sea
Մութ սենյակում – In a Dark Room
Սպասելով ամռանը – Waiting for the Summer
Հին հետքերով – Old Traces
Siempre tu' (իսպաներեն) - Siempre tu' (Spanish)
Սպասող գնացքներ (իսպաներեն) – Waiting Trains (Spanish version)

Paciencia (2013) 
El corazón como prisión
Volverás
Por el Mediterráneo
Paciencia
Coloreando
Un Día
Una semana en Barcelona
Christmas Night
El Después 
Castillo de arena 
Falling
Siempre Tú (from the album “In another City”)
Christmas Night – Armenian version

References

External links 
 

1978 births
Living people
21st-century Armenian women singers
Musicians from Yerevan
Yerevan State University alumni